Miguel Andonie Fernández (30 October 1921 in Gualala, Santa Bárbara – 30 November 2013) was a Honduran chemist, pharmacologist, academic, politician and businessman of paternal Palestinian origin. He was associated with the Colegio de Químicos y Farmacéuticos. He was the chairman of Multimedia, SA and a real estate investor, and invested much in a chain of pharmacies in Honduras. He owned one of Honduras's most notable radio stations, Radio America. The National Congress of Honduras awarded him the Honor of Merit for his contributions to politics and science.

References

Honduran chemists
Honduran academics
Honduran politicians
Honduran businesspeople
People from Santa Bárbara Department, Honduras
1921 births
2013 deaths
Honduran people of Palestinian descent
20th-century chemists
20th-century businesspeople